The Roland Battalion, officially known as Special Group Roland, was a subunit under the command of the German military intelligence agency's (the Abwehr's) special operations unit Lehrregiment "Brandenburg" z.b.V. 800 in 1941.  It and the Nachtigall Battalion were the two military units set up following the 25 February 1941 decision by the head of the Abwehr, Admiral Wilhelm Franz Canaris, who sanctioned the recruitment of a "" under German command. The Roland Battallion, formed in mid-April 1941, 350-strong and initially based in the  Ostmark (present-day Austria), was composed primarily of volunteers of Ukrainian ethnicity living in German-occupied Poland and directed to the unit by orders of  Bandera's Organization of Ukrainian Nationalists (OUN).

In Germany, in November 1941 the Ukrainian personnel of the Legion (Nachtigall and Roland battallions) was reorganized into Schutzmannschaft Battalion 201. It numbered 650 persons, who served for a year in the occupied Byelorussian Soviet Socialist Republic (present-day Belarus) before disbanding.

Formation
Prior to Operation Barbarossa, both Stepan Bandera and Andriy Melnyk, who led rival branches of the Organization of Ukrainian Nationalists actively cooperated with Nazi Germany. According to the National Academy of Sciences of Ukraine and other sources, Bandera held meetings with the heads of Germany's intelligence, regarding the formation of the Nachtigall and Roland Battalions. On 25 February 1941, the head of the Abwehr, Wilhelm Franz Canaris, sanctioned the creation of the "Ukrainian Legion" under German command. The unit would have had 800 persons. Roman Shukhevych became a commander of the Legion from the OUN-B side. OUN expected that the unit would become the core of the future Ukrainian army. In the spring the OUN received 2.5 million marks for subversive activities against the USSR. In the spring of 1941 the Legion was reorganized into 2 units. One of the units became known as Nachtigall Battalion, a second became the Roland Battalion, and the remainder was immediately dispatched into Soviet Union to sabotage the Red Army's rear.

The Battalion was set up by the Abwehr and organized by Richard Yary of the OUN(b) in March 1941, prior to the German invasion of the Soviet Union. Approximately 350 Bandera's OUN followers were trained at the Abwehr training centre at the Seibersdorf under the command of the former Polish Army major and OUN member Yevhen Pobihushchyi.

In comparison to Nachtigall, which used ordinary Wehrmacht uniform, the Roland Battalion was outfitted in the Czech uniform with yellow armband with text "Im Dienst der Deutschen Wehrmacht" (In the service of the German Wehrmacht). They were given Austrian helmets from World War I. The Battalion had arms consisting of 2 Czech light machine guns and Germans light weaponry .

Operational history
The Roland Battalion moved to Romanian-Soviet border by 15 June 1941 and placed under command of the Army's Group South. On 27 June 1941, they were placed under command of the German 11th Army with the task of moving in the Campulung Moldovenesc-Gura Humorului-Suceava-Botoşani direction, with the tasks of clearing road and transportation corridors, organizing groups of Ukrainian home guards, guarding transportation of food, helping with the evacuation of prisoners of war, and guarding strategic objectives.

On 30 June 1941, Abwehr received an order to prevent the unit from taking any military action, and it was held at Frumusola. On 24 July the Roland Battalion was transferred to the command of the 54th army corps with the task to guard roads to East of the Dniester river. At that time the Battalion had 9 officers and 260 soldiers. In time the Battalion was planned to be topped up with another 150  volunteers from the occupied areas and spend some time near Yassy

From 28 July the Battalion was directed to front-line, crossing the Dniester at Dubossari, and headed to Odesa.

Dissolution
On 10 August 1941, the command of the 11th Army received a telegram from Abwehr, saying, "After consultations with the Reichsminister of the occupied territories of the East, the Roland organization should be excluded from campaign because of political reasons". On 14 August, the battalion was recalled. 50 from the Roland personnel remained as translators at the established occupational administrations of the Reich. They were restricted however, from political activity, and after 30 days they were all relieved of duty. The rest of the Battalion returned to Focşani on 26 August 1941. Their weapons were taken from them while they traveled; they were transported to the town of Mayerling near Vienna and their weapons returned to them.

By 21 October 1941, the unit was transferred to Neuhammer where it was merged with the Nachtigall Battalion to form Schutzmannschaft Battalion 201.

References

Abwehr
Foreign volunteer units of the Wehrmacht
Organization of Ukrainian Nationalists
Military history of Germany during World War II
Military history of Ukraine during World War II
Ukrainian collaborators with Nazi Germany
Military units and formations established in 1941
Military units and formations disestablished in 1941